The Royal Artillery Factory of La Cavada was an artillery foundry at La Cavada (Riotuerto) in Cantabria, Northern Spain. 

The foundry was established in 1622 by Jean Curtius with the support of Gaspar de Guzmán, Count-Duke of Olivares and became fully operational 15 years later. Between 1637 and 1835 the facility was responsible for the production of more than 26,000 cannons for ships and fortresses throughout the Spanish Empire.

It closed after the defeat of the Spanish at the Battle of Trafalgar.

See also
Armada de Barlovento

References

1637 establishments in Spain
Foundries
Metal companies of Spain
Companies based in Cantabria
Bien de Interés Cultural landmarks in Cantabria